HK ATEK Kyiv  was an ice hockey team in Kyiv, Ukraine. The team played in the Ukrainian Hockey League, the top level of Ukrainian ice hockey.

They were founded in 1994, and were Ukrainian champions in 2007. Their last appearance in the Ukrainian Hockey League came during the 2008-09 season. The club was inactive from 2009 to 2014. ATEK returned to the Ukrainian League in 2014-15, and won their second championship by defeating the favored HC Kremenchuk in the final.

Achievements
Won the 2006–07 Ukrainian Hockey Championship
Won the 2014–15 Ukrainian Hockey Championship

References

External links
Team profile on eurohockey.com

Ice hockey teams in Ukraine
Sport in Kyiv